Ahmad Khodr Al-Tarabulsi (born 22 March 1947) is a former professional footballer who played as a goalkeeper. Born in Lebanon, he was granted Kuwaiti citizenship to play for the Kuwait national team.

International career
He also played for Kuwait at the 1980 Summer Olympics.

Al-Tarabulsi represented Kuwait in the 1982 World Cup, playing against Czechoslovakia and England. He did not concede any goals in the 1974 Gulf Cup in Kuwait.

References

1947 births
Living people
Footballers from Beirut
Kuwaiti footballers
Lebanese footballers
Kuwait international footballers
1972 AFC Asian Cup players
1976 AFC Asian Cup players
1982 FIFA World Cup players
Olympic footballers of Kuwait
Footballers at the 1980 Summer Olympics
Asian Games medalists in football
Footballers at the 1982 Asian Games
Association football goalkeepers
Lebanese emigrants to Kuwait
Asian Games silver medalists for Kuwait
Medalists at the 1982 Asian Games
Qadsia SC players
Kuwait SC players
Association football coaches
Kuwaiti people of Lebanese descent
Sportspeople of Lebanese descent
Kuwait Premier League players